Alexander William Charles Oliphant Murray, 1st Baron Murray of Elibank  (12 April 1870 – 13 September 1920), called The Master of Elibank between 1871 and 1912, was a Scottish nobleman and  Liberal politician. He served as Parliamentary Secretary to the Treasury (Chief Government Whip) under H. H. Asquith between 1910 and 1912, when he was forced to resign after being implicated in the Marconi scandal.

Background and education
Elibank was the eldest son of Montolieu Oliphant-Murray, 1st Viscount Elibank, and Blanche Alice, daughter of Edward John Scott. He was educated at Cheltenham.

Political career
Elibank unsuccessfully contested Edinburgh West in May 1895, Peebles and Selkirk in July 1895 and the City of York by-election of 1900. However, in October 1900 he was successfully returned to parliament for Midlothian, a seat he held until 1906 and again from 1910 to 1912. From 1906 to 1910 he represented Peebles and Selkirk.

In the aftermath of the Second Boer War (1899-1902), Elibank travelled to South Africa visiting the Bechuanaland Protectorate, Johannesburg, Pretoria and Delagoa Bay.

When the Liberals came to power in December 1905 under Sir Henry Campbell-Bannerman, Elibank was appointed Comptroller of the Household, a post he retained when H. H. Asquith became Prime Minister in April 1908, and then served as Under-Secretary of State for India between 1909 and 1910. The latter year he was made Parliamentary Secretary to the Treasury (Chief Government Whip). In 1911 he was sworn of the Privy Council. However, he was forced to resign in August 1912 after being accused of insider trading in the Marconi scandal. Later the same month he was raised to the peerage as Baron Murray of Elibank, of Elibank in the County of Selkirk.

Apart from his political career Elibank was a partner in S. Pearson and Son Ltd.

Personal life
Lord Murray of Elibank married Hilda Louisa Janey, daughter of Lieutenant-General Sir James Wolfe Murray, in 1894. They had no children. He died in September 1920, aged 50, predeceasing his father by seven years. The barony of Murray of Elibank became extinct on his death while his younger brother Gideon eventually succeeded in the viscountcy of Elibank. Lady Murray of Elibank died in September 1929.

References

External links
 

1870 births
1920 deaths
Scottish Liberal Party MPs
Members of the Parliament of the United Kingdom for Scottish constituencies
Barons in the Peerage of the United Kingdom
Members of the Privy Council of the United Kingdom
UK MPs 1900–1906
UK MPs 1906–1910
UK MPs 1910
UK MPs 1910–1918
UK MPs who were granted peerages
Heirs apparent who never acceded
Barons created by George V